The Observance of 5th November Act 1605, also known as the Thanksgiving Act, was an act of the Parliament of England passed in 1606 in the aftermath of the Gunpowder Plot.

The originating bill was drafted and introduced on 23 January 1606 (New Style) by Edward Montagu and called for a public, annual thanksgiving for the failure of the plot. It required church ministers to hold a special service of thanksgiving annually on 5 November, during which the text of the act was to be read out loud. Everyone was required to attend, and to remain orderly throughout the service, although no penalties were prescribed for breach. The act remained on the statute book until 1859.

Preamble

The preamble to the act set out the political background, noting that 

It further stated that, as some of the principal conspirators had confessed, the conspiracy was purposely devised to be done in the House 

The preamble concluded by setting out the purpose of the act:

Provisions
The act required that all "Ministers in every Cathedral and Parish Church, or other usual Place for Common Prayer … shall always upon the fifth Day of November say Morning Prayer, and give unto Almighty God Thanks for this most happy Deliverance". During the service the minister had to "publickly, distinctly and plainly" read out the text of the act.

It further required all persons to "diligently and faithfully resort to the Parish Church or Chapel accustomed"  on 5 November and "to abide orderly and soberly during the Time of said Prayers, Preaching or other Services of God."

Every minister was required to give warning to his parishioners publicly in the church at morning prayer on the Sunday beforehand.

The act prescribed no penalties or other consequences should its requirements be breached.

Influence 
The Observance of 5th November Act 1605 was one of the first examples of legislative commemoration, serving as a template for similar legislation requiring commemoration of the Virginian massacre (1622), the Irish Rebellion (1641), the execution of Charles I (1649), and the Stuart Restoration (1660) on Royal Oak Apple Day.

Repeal 
The law was repealed on 25 March 1859 by the Anniversary Days Observance Act.

See also
 Guy Fawkes Night
 Guy Fawkes

References

Bibliography

External links
Full text
Image of the Act on the UK Parliamentary website

Acts of the Parliament of England
1605 in law
1605 in English law
Gunpowder Plot